Jennyfer Marques Parinos (born 22 February 1996) is a Brazilian para table tennis player who competes in international elite competitions. She is a Paralympic bronze medalist, double Parapan American Games silver medalist and a World champion. She has won numerous team event medals with Danielle Rauen and Bruna Costa Alexandre.

Marques Parinos was diagnosed at a young with a rare disease called X-linked hypophosphatemia (XLH) when she found walking unaided painful.

References

1996 births
Living people
Sportspeople from Santos, São Paulo
Paralympic table tennis players of Brazil
Table tennis players at the 2016 Summer Paralympics
Medalists at the 2016 Summer Paralympics
Medalists at the 2015 Parapan American Games
Medalists at the 2019 Parapan American Games
Table tennis players at the 2020 Summer Paralympics
Brazilian female table tennis players
21st-century Brazilian women